Events in the year 2018 in Cameroon.

Incumbents
President: Paul Biya
Prime Minister: Philémon Yang

Events
 Cameroonian presidential election, 2018

Deaths

2 April – Elie Onana, footballer (b. 1951).

13 October – Fabien Eboussi Boulaga, philosopher (b. 1934).

References

 
2010s in Cameroon 
Years of the 21st century in Cameroon 
Cameroon 
Cameroon